Spork EP is an EP released by indie rock band Flake Music.

Track listing
"Pull Out of Your Head Size" – 4:30
"Dying Lack of Spit" – 4:19
"Totto" – 3:24
"Nuevo" – 4:03
"Dilly Dally" – 3:36
"6." – 4:19

References
1 A Flakey Start: The Shins' Beginnings

1995 EPs
The Shins albums